Events from the year 1925 in Canada.

Incumbents

Crown 
 Monarch – George V

Federal government 
 Governor General – Julian Byng 
 Prime Minister – William Lyon Mackenzie King
 Chief Justice – Francis Alexander Anglin (Ontario)
 Parliament – 14th (until 5 September)

Provincial governments

Lieutenant governors 
Lieutenant Governor of Alberta – Robert Brett (until October 29) then William Egbert 
Lieutenant Governor of British Columbia – Walter Cameron Nichol 
Lieutenant Governor of Manitoba – James Albert Manning Aikins  
Lieutenant Governor of New Brunswick – William Frederick Todd 
Lieutenant Governor of Nova Scotia – MacCallum Grant (until January 12) then James Robson Douglas (January 12 to September 14) then James Cranswick Tory 
Lieutenant Governor of Ontario – Henry Cockshutt
Lieutenant Governor of Prince Edward Island – Frank Richard Heartz 
Lieutenant Governor of Quebec – Narcisse Pérodeau
Lieutenant Governor of Saskatchewan – Henry William Newlands

Premiers 
Premier of Alberta – Herbert Greenfield (until November 23) then John Edward Brownlee   
Premier of British Columbia – John Oliver 
Premier of Manitoba – John Bracken 
Premier of New Brunswick – Peter Veniot (until September 14) then John Baxter 
Premier of Nova Scotia – Ernest Howard Armstrong (until July 16) then Edgar Nelson Rhodes 
Premier of Ontario – George Howard Ferguson 
Premier of Prince Edward Island – James D. Stewart
Premier of Quebec – Louis-Alexandre Taschereau 
Premier of Saskatchewan – Charles Avery Dunning

Territorial governments

Commissioners 
 Gold Commissioner of Yukon – George P. MacKenzie (until April 1) then Percy Reid 
 Commissioner of Northwest Territories – William Wallace Cory

Events
February 5 – Post Office workers are brought under civil service regulations.
February 24 – The Lake of the Woods Treaty works out joint Canadian-American control of the Lake of the Woods.
April 13 – Women win the right to vote in Newfoundland. 
May 28 – Roddick Gates unveiled in Montreal.
June 2 – 1925 Saskatchewan general election: Charles Dunning's Liberals win a sixth consecutive majority
June 10 – The United Church of Canada opens for services.
June 11 – Coal miner William Davis was killed by police in the culmination of a long Cape Breton Island strike.
June 23 – First ascent of Mount Logan, the highest mountain in Canada.
June 26 – A strike of miners in Drumheller, Alberta ends in violent confrontations.
July 16 – Edgar Rhodes becomes premier of Nova Scotia, replacing Ernest Armstrong.
September 14 – John Baxter becomes premier of New Brunswick, replacing Peter Veniot
October 29 – Federal election: Arthur Meighen's Conservatives win a plurality (116 seats), defeating Mackenzie King's Liberals (99 seats). However, King does not resign as prime minister; he will try to govern with a minority government with the support of smaller parties and independent MPs (30 seats)
November 23 – John Brownlee becomes premier of Alberta, replacing Charles Stewart
The Canadian Legion of the British Empire Service League, later the Royal Canadian Legion, is formed by the amalgamation of several veterans' organizations, such as the Great War Veterans Association.
 The federal divorce law was changed to allow a woman to divorce her husband on the same grounds that a man could divorce his wife – simple adultery. Before this, a woman had to prove adultery in conjunction with other acts such as "sodomy" or bestiality in order to initiate a divorce.

Arts and literature
October 1 – The Vancouver School of Applied and Decorative Arts opened its doors.

Sport
March 23 and 25 – South Saskatchewan Junior Hockey League's Regina Pats win their first Memorial Cup by defeating the Ontario Hockey Association's Toronto Aura Lee 7 to 3 in a 2-game aggregate played in Arena Gardens in Toronto
March 30 – Western Canada Hockey League's Victoria Cougars win their only Stanley Cup by defeating the National Hockey League's Montreal Canadiens 3 games to 1. The deciding game was played at Vancouver's Denman Arena. The Cougars are the last non-NHL team to win the Stanley Cup, as they would soon become the Detroit Red Wings
December 5 – The Ottawa Senators win their first Grey Cup by defeating the Winnipeg Tammany Tigers 24 to 1 in the 13th Grey Cup played at Ottawa's Lansdowne Park

Births

January to June
January 26 – Claude Ryan, politician (d. 2004)
February 1 – Hugh Horner, politician, physician and surgeon (d. 1997)
February 7 – Hans Schmidt, professional wrestler (d. 2012)
March 2 – Bernard Jean, lawyer and politician, member (1960–1970) and Speaker (1963–1966) of the Legislative Assembly of New Brunswick (d. 2012)
March 23 – Wilson Duff, anthropologist (d. 1976)
March 25 – Daniel Yanofsky, chess player, Canada's first chess grandmaster (d. 2000)
March 26 – Ben Mondor, baseball executive (Pawtucket Red Sox) (d. 2010) 
April 1 – Tobie Steinhouse, artist
April 4 – Claude Wagner, judge and politician (d. 1979)
April 11 – Pierre Péladeau, businessman (d. 1997)
May 18 – Robin Blaser, author and poet (d. 2009)

July to September
July 21 – Johnny Peirson, ice hockey player (d. 2021)
July 25 – Charmion King, actress (d. 2007)

July 29 – Ted Lindsay, ice hockey player (d. 2019)
August 2 – William Andres, politician (d. 2010)
August 11 – Floyd Curry, ice hockey player (d. 2006)
August 15 – Oscar Peterson, jazz pianist and composer (d. 2007)
September 4 – Calvin Ruck, anti-racism activist and Senator (d. 2004)
September 11 – Harry Somers, composer (d. 1999)
September 24 – Dan Heap, politician (d. 2014)

October to December
October 2 – Wren Blair, hockey coach and manager (Minnesota North Stars, Pittsburgh Penguins) (d. 2013)
October 6 – Bud Olson, politician, Minister and Senator (d. 2002)
October 12 – Denis Lazure, politician (d. 2008)
October 21 – Peter Dickinson, architect (d. 1961)
October 21 – Louis Robichaud, lawyer, politician and 25th Premier of New Brunswick (d. 2005)
November 8 – Allan Lawrence, politician and Minister (d. 2008)
November 10 – Doris Anderson, author, journalist and women's rights activist (d. 2007)
November 12 – Agnes Nanogak, illustrator (d. 2001)
December 5 – Dave Broadfoot, comedian (d. 2016)
December 25 – Robert Layton, politician (d. 2002)
December 29 – Colleen Thibaudeau, poet and short-story writer (d. 2012)

Deaths

January to June
January 25 – Charles-Eusèbe Dionne, naturalist and taxidermist (b. 1845)
March 3 – William Pugsley, lawyer, politician and 10th Premier of New Brunswick (b. 1850)
March 16 – Richard Butler, editor, publisher, journalist and U.S. vice-consul (b. 1834)
May 4 – James Cunningham, merchant and politician (b. 1834)
May 25 – Margaret Mick, prison guard, first female Canadian peace officer to be killed in the line of duty (b. 1860)
June 18 – William Brymner, art teacher and painter (b. 1855)

July to December
August 15 – Adam Beck, politician and hydro-electricity advocate (b. 1857)
September 6 – George Henry Bradbury, politician (b. 1859)
November 2 – James Alexander Lougheed, businessman and politician (b. 1854)

See also 
 List of Canadian films

Historical documents
Rabbi claims only way to international peace is through righteousness

Charles Saunders' search for Prairies-hardy variety of wheat leads to Marquis, "which has meant millions of dollars to this country

Stephen Leacock resents requirement that works of authors seeking Canadian copyright must be printed in Canada

Radio station CKAC of La Presse claims to encourage expat Québécois/e to return and to keep farmers on their farms

United Church of Canada Basis of Union accommodates doctrines of three Protestant denominations

PM King blames loss of election and his seat on big interests' money and Liberal Party's lack of organization

Minnie Bell Sharp, first New Brunswick female candidate for MP, runs on soldiers, mothers and other issues

Inuit near Baillie Island are successful and "comparatively well to do" trappers without "influx of too many whites" but "advanced in business ideas"

For Inuit, "approaching civilization" means learning lessons and making mental progress with "care and effort" of close contacts and law enforcement

To advance, Inuit need disease eradication, "remunerative industry" within life on local natural resources, schools with natives teaching local ways, etc.

With transition from Czar to Soviets in Russia, Doukhobors split on returning there from Canada

Newlywed Mountie writes of his new home life in Dawson City, Yukon

Beautiful brochure for Empress of France round-the-world cruise to see "costumes, crafts and civilizations of fifty different races"

References 

 
Years of the 20th century in Canada
Canada
1925 in North America